John Sellers (1728 – 1804), was an American scientist, engineer, and legislator, who was born at Sellers Hall in Upper Darby, Pennsylvania, on November 19, 1728.

Sellers was one of the original members of the American Philosophical Society and with David Rittenhouse and others was one of the committee of that organization that observed the Transit of Venus in 1769 and reported their observations for the benefit of science. He was a skilled surveyor and engineer and played a part on numerous public works, including the construction of the Strasburg road in 1772, the Schuylkill-Susquehanna canal study of 1783, and the boundary commission for the newly created Delaware County in 1789.

Public spirited and capable, Sellers played an important role in political affairs throughout his life, first in the colonial Assembly from 1767, and then in efforts on behalf of American rights and eventually Independence. He was appointed one of the Boston Port Bill Committee and was a deputy in the first Provincial Conference of Representatives at Philadelphia on July 14, 1774. These activities on behalf of the Revolution and particularly Sellers' role in signing the Continental currency led to his disownment by the Society of Friends.

Sellers represented Delaware County in the Pennsylvania Constitutional Convention of 1790 and was elected to the first Pennsylvania State Senate.

He died at Sellers Hall on February 2, 1804.

Andrew Dawson, Lives of the Philadelphia Engineers: Capital, Class, and Revolution (2004).
George Eschol Sellers, Early Engineering Reminiscences (1965).
Dominic Vitiello,  Engineering Philadelphia: The Sellers Family and the Industrial Metropolis (2013).
Anthony F.C. Wallace, Rockdale (1978).

References

18th-century American scientists
18th-century American politicians
18th-century American engineers
1728 births
1804 deaths